John Roper (birth registered in the third quarter of 1936 – 14 October 2015), also known by the nickname of "Sol", was an English professional rugby league footballer who played in the 1950s and 1960s, and coached in the 1960s and 1970s.

Rugby League clubs

 Captained Hensingham A.R.L.F.C. (in Hensingham Whitehaven),
 Workington Town,
 Broughton Moor A.R.L.F.C. (in Broughton Moor),

Playing career

County honours
Sol Roper at representative level for the  Cumberland rugby league team, whilst at Workington Town.

Challenge Cup Final appearances
Sol Roper played , sustained a shoulder injury but returned to the field, in Workington Town's 12–21 defeat by Barrow in the 1954–55 Challenge Cup Final at Wembley Stadium, London on Saturday 30 April 1955 in front of a crowd of 66,513, and was, at the age of 21 years, the youngest Wembley captain in Workington Town's 9–13 defeat by Wigan in the 1957–58 Challenge Cup Final at Wembley Stadium, on Saturday 10 May 1958.

Genealogical information
Sol Roper was the father of the rugby league footballer Tony Roper , and the grandfather of the rugby league footballer Jon Roper.

References

External links
Search for "Roper" at rugbyleagueproject.org
(archived by web.archive.org) » Legends Evening 60's
Nostalgia: Harry and Sol had formula for a perfect partnership
Wembley Legend Sol Roper Star Guest At Workington Town
Workington and Whitehaven mourn death of John 'Sol' Roper
Tributes for Town legend Sol Roper
Sol Roper

1936 births
2015 deaths
Cumberland rugby league team players
English rugby league coaches
English rugby league players
Rugby league halfbacks
Rugby league players from Whitehaven
Whitehaven R.L.F.C. coaches
Whitehaven R.L.F.C. players
Workington Town captains
Workington Town coaches
Workington Town players